William John Villaume (June 17, 1914 – March 27, 1995) was an American Lutheran minister and the first president of Waterloo Lutheran University. He held the position from 1960 to 1966.

References

1914 births
1995 deaths
20th-century American Lutheran clergy
Canadian university and college chief executives
Academic staff of Wilfrid Laurier University